Perwillowen is a rural locality in the Sunshine Coast Region, Queensland, Australia.

History 
The name Perwillowen is reportedly an Aboriginal name for pigeons. It has had many variant spellings over the years including Pillywillman, Pillawillamon, Pillewilliman and Perwillowan.

Perwillowen Provisional School opened on 15 May 1916, becoming Perwillowen State School about 1923. It closed in October 1930 due to low student numbers but reopened on 13 July 1932. It finally closed in 1959.

Amenities 
Nambour Wesleyan Methodist Church is at 165 Perwillowen Road. It is part of the Wesleyan Methodist Church of Australia.

References

Further reading 
 

Suburbs of the Sunshine Coast Region
Localities in Queensland